Hand It Down is the second studio album by Australian country music singer-songwriter James Blundell, released in July 1990 by EMI. It was produced by Garth Porter  The album peaked at number 50 on the ARIA albums chart. It provided four singles "Age of Grace" (July 1990), "The Blue Heeler" (October), "Water" (1991) and "Time on His Hands" (September). At the 1991 ARIA Music Awards Hand It Down won Best Country Album.

Background 

Australian country music singer-songwriter James Blundell released his second studio album Hand It Down in July 1990. It was recorded across three studios in Sydney: Festival Studios, Studios 301 and Sussex Studios with Garth Porter (Rockwell T. James, the Sherbs, Sunnyboys) producing for EMI Records. Porter also provided keyboards, percussion and piano and co-wrote three tracks with Blundell. Blundell promoted Hand It Down with tours in Australia, United States and Canada. It provided four singles "Age of Grace" (July 1990), "The Blue Heeler" (October), "Water" (1991) and "Time on His Hands" (September).

Reception 

Megan Bird of The Canberra Times described Hand It Down as "a philosophical blend of ballads and up-tempo rockers which deal with life and the values of old rural Australia and the new urban world." AllMusic's reviewer rated it at three-out-of-five stars.

It debuted at number 77 on the ARIA Albums Chart for the week commencing 6 August 1990 and peaked at number 50 in October 1991. At the 1991 ARIA Music Awards Hand It Down won the Best Country Album.

Track listing

Personnel 

Credits:

Musicians
 James Blundell – lead vocals, acoustic guitar, harmonica, backing vocals

 Chris Bailey – backing vocals
 James Gillard – bass guitar, backing vocals
 Mark Meyer – drums
 Larry Muhoberac – piano, piano accordion
 Garth Porter – keyboards, percussion, piano
 Mark Punch – guitars (acoustic, electric), backing vocals
 Ian Simpson – banjo

Artisans
 Ted Howard – audio engineer
 Merran Laginestra – assistant engineer
 Garth Porter – producer

Charts

Release history

References

James Blundell (singer) albums
1990 albums
ARIA Award-winning albums
Albums produced by Garth Porter